Portugal's first participation in the Summer Olympic Games took place at the 1912 Summer Olympics in Stockholm, Sweden. The nation was represented by a delegation of six competitors, who took part in three sports but failed to win a medal. The Portuguese debut participation was marked by the death of flag bearer Francisco Lázaro, who succumbed to electrolytic imbalance after the marathon race.

Athletics

4 athletes represented Portugal in the nation's Olympic debut. Lázaro collapsed during the marathon due to his use of wax to prevent sweating; he died the next morning.

Ranks given are within that athlete's heat for running events.

Fencing

A single fencer represented Portugal in that nation's Olympic debut. Fernando Correia was disqualified in the first round of the épée competition.

Wrestling

Greco-Roman
Portugal's Olympic debut included two wrestlers. Both wrestlers lost their first bout, won their second, and lost their third to be eliminated.

Officials
 Fernando Correia (chief of mission)

References

Stockholm Organizing Committee for the Games of the V Olympiad (1913). Official Report of the Olympic Games of Stockholm 1912 (Retrieved on November 2, 2006)
International Olympic Committee - Olympic medal winners database
1912 Olympians from Portugal

Nations at the 1912 Summer Olympics
1912
Olympics